Fie Christine Skarsoe (born 18 December 1976, Aarhus) is a Danish-born equestrian athlete competing for Luxembourg. She competed at the European Championships in 2005 under the Danish flag and in 2015 and 2019 under the flag of Luxembourg.

Biography
Fie started riding at an age of nine in Denmark and competed successfully in the youth division. She competed at the European Championships for Young Riders in 1996. In 2006 she moved to Luxembourg where she met her husband. In 2015 she obtained her dual citizenship and competed that same year for Luxembourg at the European Championships in Aachen.

Personal life
Fie Christine Skarsoe is married to her Luxembourgish husband Kent Gruber, which is a national show-jumper. She is fluent in Danish, English and German.

References

1976 births
Living people
Luxembourgian equestrians
Luxembourgian dressage riders